Gergő Rása (born 7 March 1989) is a Hungarian professional footballer who plays as a striker for Vác FC.

References

External links
Profile at HLSZ

1989 births
Living people
Hungarian footballers
Association football midfielders
MTK Budapest FC players
Újpest FC players
Rákospalotai EAC footballers
Fehérvár FC players
Lombard-Pápa TFC footballers
Nemzeti Bajnokság II players
Footballers from Budapest